Shut Down Volume 2 is the fifth album by the American rock band the Beach Boys, released March 2, 1964 on Capitol Records. Produced by Brian Wilson, it is the follow-up to the band's Little Deuce Coupe, released the previous October, and to Shut Down, a Capitol compilation album. Shut Down Volume 2 was the first of three studio albums that the band released in 1964, and the first recorded without guitarist David Marks, who departed from the band following disagreements with manager Murry Wilson. The album reached number 13 in the US during a chart stay of 38 weeks.

Rediscovered master tapes
The multi-tracks for Shut Down Volume 2 went missing shortly after the album's release. In 2009, three reels of session outtakes were unexpectedly retrieved with the help of biographer Jon Stebbins, thanks to a fan who had found and kept the tapes untouched for years. New stereophonic mixes were created by producers Mark Linett and Alan Boyd for the compilation Summer Love Songs, which includes an alternate version of "Why Do Fools Fall in Love" featuring a never-before-heard unused intro section as well as a new stereo mix of "Don't Worry Baby".

With these reels, new stereo mixes of "Fun, Fun, Fun", "The Warmth of the Sun" and "Pom Pom Play Girl" were also created in 2013; the first two of these three appearing along with the aforementioned remixed songs on the Made in California box set, and all five remixes surfacing on the 2014 compilation Keep an Eye on Summer – The Beach Boys Sessions 1964, which featured select session highlights from these reels.

Track listing

Personnel
Partial credits sourced from Craig Slowinski, includes all tracks except ""Cassius" Love vs. "Sonny" Wilson", "This Car of Mine", "Shut Down, Part II" and "Louie, Louie". Instrumental credits for "This Car of Mine" taken from Jon Stebbins. Track numbers in parenthesis.

The Beach Boys
Al Jardine - backing vocals , bass guitar , rhythm electric guitar 
Mike Love - lead vocals , backing vocals , tenor saxophone 
Brian Wilson – lead vocals , backing vocals , piano , Hammond B-3 organ 
Carl Wilson – lead vocals , backing vocals , electric guitar 
Dennis Wilson – lead vocals , backing vocals , drums , floor tom 
Additional musicians

 Ray Pohlman – 6-string bass guitar , bass guitar 
 Hal Blaine – drums , tambourine , bell-tree , percussion , timpani 
 Steve Douglas – tenor saxophone 
 Jay Migliori – baritone saxophone 
 Leon Russell – piano , tack piano 
 Bill Pitman – archtop acoustic guitar 
 Tommy Tedesco – electric guitar 
 Jimmy Bond – double bass 
 Frank Capp – glockenspiel , temple blocks , castanets 
 Al de Lory – piano 
 Plas Johnson – tenor saxophone

Charts

References

External links

The Beach Boys albums
1964 albums
Capitol Records albums
Albums produced by Brian Wilson
Rock-and-roll albums
Albums recorded at Gold Star Studios
Albums recorded at United Western Recorders